Beppie is the stage name of Stephanie Nhan, a Canadian children's musician, and educator from Edmonton, Alberta. She is most noted as a two-time Juno Award nominee for Children's Album of the Year, receiving nods at the Juno Awards of 2019 for Let's Go Bananas! and at the Juno Awards of 2023 for Nice to Meet You.

A music teacher at Edmonton's Resonate Music School & Studio, she released her debut album There's a Song Inside Me in 2017. Her style is marked by efforts to create music that is fun for children while remaining listenable and enjoyable to parents who are listening to it with them.

In addition to her Juno Award nominations, she is a two-time Western Canadian Music Award nominee for Children's Artist of the Year, receiving nods in 2020 and 2022.

Discography
There's a Song Inside Me - 2017
Let's Go Bananas! - 2018
Song Soup - 2019
Dino-Mite! - 2021
Nice to Meet You - 2022

References

External links

21st-century Canadian women singers
Canadian children's musicians
Musicians from Edmonton
Canadian music educators
Living people
Year of birth missing (living people)